Kartel may refer to:

Kartel, Liquor Store, a store in Barangka Ibaba, Mandaluyong
Kartel, Maharashtra, a village in Ratnagiri district, Maharashtra state, India
Kartel (electoral alliance), Dutch term for an electoral alliance between two or more parties in Belgium
The Kartel, professional wrestling tag team made up of Terry Frazier and Sha Samuels

Music
Kartel Records is a Malaysian hip-hop record label
Vybz Kartel (born in 1976), real name Adidja Palmer, Jamaican dancehall artist, songwriter and businessman
Juke Kartel, (now London Cries), a rock band from Melbourne, Australia
Van Coke Kartel, Afrikaans punk rock band from Cape Town, South Africa
Kartellen, Swedish gangstarap and hip hop band

See also

Cartel
Cartel (disambiguation)
Kariel